Tania (born 6 May 1993) is an Indian actress known for her work in Punjabi cinema. She has been nominated for two Brit Asia TV Awards, winning one for "Best Supporting Actress" for her performance in Qismat (2018).

Early life 
Tania was born on 6 May 1993 in Jamshedpur, India to parents from Punjab. Brought up in Amritsar, she has one younger sister Tamannah. She attended Guru Nanak Dev University and BBK DAV College for Women, Amritsar where she won the "Best Actor of the Year" award each year from 2012 to 2016. She has a degree in Interior Designing and Project management. She is also a Classical dancer and National level participant.

Acting career 
She was selected for the 2016 Bollywood film Sarabjit to play Sarabjit’s daughter, but as the filming schedule conflicted with her final exams, she had to forgo the role. Her first film role was in Son of Manjeet Singh but that film was not released until after Qismat.

Filmography

Music videos

Awards and nominations

References

External links 

 
 

Living people
Actresses in Punjabi cinema
1993 births